Quibell may refer to:

People
Baron Quibell, a title created in the Peerage of the United Kingdom
David Quibell, 1st Baron Quibell (1879–1962), British politician
James Quibell (1867–1935), British Egyptologist
Michelle Quibell (born 1984), American squash player

Places
Quibell, Ontario, community in Ontario
Quibell Park Stadium in Scunthorpe, North Lincolnshire

de:Quibell